The 2014 Morgan State Bears football team represented Morgan State University in the 2014 NCAA Division I FCS football season. They were led by first-year head coach Lee Hull and played their home games at Hughes Stadium. They were a member of the Mid-Eastern Athletic Conference (MAC). Morgan State finished the season 7–6 overall and 6–2 in MEAC play to finish in a five-way tie for a share of the conference championship. After tiebreakers, they received the conference's automatic bid to the FCS Playoffs, where they lost in the first round to Richmond.

Schedule

Source: Schedule

References

Morgan State
Morgan State Bears football seasons
Mid-Eastern Athletic Conference football champion seasons
Morgan State
Morgan State Bears football